Hypostomus rondoni is a species of catfish in the family Loricariidae. It is native to South America, where it occurs in the Tapajós basin. The species reaches 8 cm (3.1 inches) in total length and is believed to be a facultative air-breather.

References 

rondoni
Fish described in 1912